Mohammad Heidari (born May 26, 1986) is an Iranian footballer who plays for Saba Qom in the IPL.

Club career
Heidari had played his entire career with Malavan, until he moved to Fajr Sepasi in the summer of 2013.

Club career statistics

 Assist Goals

References

External links

1986 births
Living people
Malavan players
Fajr Sepasi players
Saba players
Iranian footballers
Association football forwards